The Firestone Assessment of Violent Thoughts (FAVT) is a psychiatric assessment tool published by PAR in 2008 by Robert W. Firestone and Lisa Firestone designed to predict violent thoughts that may ultimately lead to violent behavior. The FAVT can be given in interview format by a psychological professional or in written format and is administered in 15 minutes. FAVT items are organized into five levels and two theoretical subscales. These levels and subscales allow a better understanding of the individual in order to offer more targeted treatment.

Levels
Paranoid/Suspicious
Persecuted Misfit
Self-deprecating/Pseudo-independent
Self-aggrandizing
Overly aggressive

Theoretical Subscales
Instrumental/Proactive violence
Hostile/Reactive violence

Development and Research
The FAVT is a brief self-report assessment tool established on the principle that one's thought processes influence one's potential for violent behavior. Psychologists Robert W. Firestone and Lisa Firestone developed the concept of an inner "voice" within a person's mind which commentatates and criticizes the individual and others, and this voice plays a role in violent thoughts. The "voice" and subsequent violent thoughts prime violent behavior and can be used to assess risk factor for violent and aggressive behavior.

The research process in designing the FAVT included data gathered on 639 prisoners, parolees, and domestic violence perpetrators. The Glendon Association's research has found that the FAVT can be used to distinguish between violent and nonviolent individuals. A pilot study was performed and results indicated that the FAVT was able to distinguish between adolescents with a history of violence and those without such a history.

FAVT-A
The Firestone Assessment of Violent Thoughts–Adolescent (FAVT-A) uses the same principles and research as the FAVT, but is designed for adolescents ages 11–18 years. The 35 FAVT-A items are organized into the same five levels and two theoretical subscales as the FAVT.

See also
Diagnostic classification and rating scales used in psychiatry
Self-report inventory

References

External links
 FAVT on the Publisher's Website
 The Glendon Association
 PsychAlive

Mental disorders screening and assessment tools
Personality tests